Kyle Renfro (born April 30, 1991) is an American retired soccer player who is currently an assistant coach for the Duke Blue Devils.

Career

College
Renfro attended Virginia Tech and played four years of college soccer. Renfro started all 17 games for the Hokies in 2013, recording 1642 minutes and earning First Team Scholar All-America honors, Second Team All-Region honors, First Team All-State honors.  Renfro also became only the second Hokie to garner First Team All-ACC honors after leading the ACC in saves for three straight years with 88 saves total.

Professional
In 2014, Renfro began his professional career with the Charlotte Eagles making five appearances for the team.

In 2015, Renfro joined the Harrisburg City Islanders. He made his debut for the City Islanders in the third round of the 2015 U.S. Open Cup against the Rochester Rhinos. Renfro maintained the shutout until extra time, when the Islanders fell 1-3 at home.

In 2016, Renfro was signed by the Charlotte Independence.

References

External links
 Duke profile
 Harrisburg City Islanders

1991 births
Living people
American soccer players
Virginia Tech Hokies men's soccer players
Charlotte Eagles players
Penn FC players
Charlotte Independence players
Soccer players from Virginia
USL Championship players
USL League Two players
Association football goalkeepers
American soccer coaches
Winthrop Eagles men's soccer coaches
Virginia Tech Hokies men's soccer coaches
Duke Blue Devils men's soccer coaches